The 1980 Olympics may refer to:
 1980 Winter Olympics, Lake Placid, New York, United States
 1980 Summer Olympics, Moscow, Russian SFSR, Soviet Union